Cabin Cove, California is a small and historic community located in the Sierra Nevada and Sequoia National Forest, within Tulare County, California.

Geography
Sequoia National Park surrounds the summer cabins in Cabin Cove. It is on the Mineral King Road, about 20 miles east of the town of Three Rivers, and about 5 miles west of Mineral King.

Cabin Cove is accessible via the Mineral King Road usually between the months of May and November, when the road is not obstructed by snow.

External links

Unincorporated communities in Tulare County, California
Sequoia National Forest
Unincorporated communities in California